Fort Erie Airport  is a former airport which was located near Fort Erie, Ontario, Canada.

References

External links
COPA Places to Fly page about this airport

Defunct airports in Ontario
Transport in the Regional Municipality of Niagara